Louis XIII Crowned by Victory is a 1635 oil on canvas painting by Philippe de Champaigne. Probably commissioned by cardinal Richelieu, it shows Louis XIII crowned by a personification of Victory to mark his forces' victory in the Siege of La Rochelle. Since 1796 it has been in Louvre Museum.

References

1635 paintings
Paintings in the Louvre by French artists
17th-century portraits
Louis XIII
Cardinal Richelieu